The Luke Walton Band is an American alternative rock band from San Diego, California, composed of students from The University of Southern California's Popular Music Program. The members include Logan Shrewsbury (Drums), Peter Johnson (Violin), Nick "Thor" Campbell (Bass), and Luke Walton (Guitar, Vocals, Piano).

During the school year of 2009–2010, the band performed weekly around Los Angeles and began to form a fan base. Following that, they began a tour of the California coast.

Walton rose to internet fame by asking pop artist Taylor Swift out on a date via YouTube. The video soon went viral leading to being featured on the cover of Trojan Family Magazine's 2009 Winter volume as well as having articles written in national newspapers such as Nashville's The City Paper, NBC, Orlando Sentinel, as well as others.

In early 2010, the band self-released, produced, performed, and distributed its first album, Goodbye/Hello.

History

Formation (2006) 
Walton had been a solo artist for several years who had been featured on both national radio as well as national television.  Although he was having profound success for a solo artist of his age, Walton believed he could gain more exposure by forming a full band to play locally.  He got together with friends Jonathan Gillie (guitar), Zach Freeman (drums / backup vocals), and Peter Rosenbaum (bass) and formed the group Mannequin.

Mannequin (2006–2008) 
While Walton was in high school, Walton with Gillie, Freeman and Rosenbaum started the band to enter into their school's Battle of The Bands competition.  The band played original songs written by Walton as well as a cover by Katy Perry.  After months of playing together, the band finished second in the competition and decided to disband for the summer.

Blue Suburbia (2008–2009) 
The following year, Walton wanted to start a cover classic rock and blues trio band with Zach Freeman.  After a brief search, the twosome met Jordan Sorokin (bass) and formed the band Blue Suburbia.  The band played mainly covers from artists such as Eric Clapton, John Mayer, and others, along with playing a few originals written by Walton.  The band performed at La Costa Canyon High School's Battle of The Bands and finished first.  At the end of the following summer (2009), the band recorded a four-song EP called The Other Side.  When the members of the band all left for college, the band was put on hold.  Walton attended The University of Southern California, Jordan Sorokin attended University of Pennsylvania, and Zach Freeman attended Texas Christian University.

The Luke Walton Band (2009–2011) 
Walton was accepted into The University of Southern California's Popular Music Program.  During his first semester, he formed a band with a few of other students in his major.  The new members were Logan Shrewsbury (Drums), Peter Johnson (Violin), and Nick "Thor" Campbell (Bass).  The members decided to name the band The Luke Walton Band and play originals written by Walton.  During the school year of 2009–2010, the band played weekly local shows around Los Angeles and began to form a fan base.
	
During the summer of 2010, The Luke Walton Band went on a tour up the California coast from San Diego to San Francisco.  The band stopped in various cities and playing with artists such as Rozzi Crane, Liplash, and others.

YouTube

Original songs 
Walton began his YouTube campaign on December 17, 2008, by uploading videos of himself performing his original songs "Preschool,"  "Heart In Hand," and "Dead End Love."  The three videos have accumulated over 14,000 views and have been featured on various publications

Six Months To Make It 
In January 2009, Luke began an online video blog titled, "Six Months To Make It."  The vlog was made to keep fans updated with the latest news as well as to act as a promotion tool.  The first episode was uploaded on January 12, 2009, and was titled, "Driving Test."  The entire series contains 21 episodes and documents events varying from significant moment's in Walton's musical career to live performances.

Weekly cover songs 
In March 2009, Walton launched a short series of weekly cover songs.  He covered songs by artists such as Plain White Ts, The Beatles, Taio Cruz, Katy Perry, Jay Sean, and Taylor Swift.  His parody video of Jay Sean's song, "Do You Remember," became a recognizable hit amongst The University of Southern California's community and quickly received over 25,000 hits.  The video featured the band, students, and  Luke's great grandmother.

Taylor Swift date video 
Walton's most nationally known video was YouTube video where he asked country artist Taylor Swift out on a date and covered her song "Love Story." The video was covered in national newspapers such as Nashville's The City Paper, NBC, Orlando Sentinel, as well as others.  Since the video's uploading on March 21, 2009, it has received over 233,000 views.

References

External links 
 Official YouTube Channel
 Official BandCamp
 Official MySpace

Alternative rock groups from California
American pop music groups
Musical groups from San Diego
Musical groups established in 2006